Nikolaus Meyer-Landrut (born 1960) is a German diplomat currently serving as the Head of the EU Delegation to Turkey. He was previously German Ambassador to France from 2015 to 2020. Before that, he served as the chief adviser for European affairs to the German Chancellor, Angela Merkel.

Early life and education
Meyer-Landrut was born in 1960 and was awarded his PhD in history, examining the role of France in German reunification, at the University of Cologne in 1988.

Career
In 1987, Meyer-Landrut joined the German foreign office under the third cabinet of the conservative chancellor Helmut Kohl. Between 1990 and 1993, the diplomat served in Vienna, leading the German negotiations of the Treaty on Conventional Armed Forces in Europe, and advised on German foreign affairs in Brussels thereafter (until 1995). From 1995 to 1999 Meyer-Landrut was deputy chief of the central ministerial office in Bonn, responsible for the Amsterdam Treaty and the Common Foreign and Security Policy of the European Union among other things attached to that portfolio.

Between 1999 and summer 2002, Meyer-Landrut served as press spokesperson of the Permanent Representation of the Federal Republic of Germany to the European Union under the social democratic–green Schröder administration and was appointed spokesperson of the president of the Convention on the Future of Europe by Valéry Giscard d’Estaing, the convention's president and former president of France (1974–81). Between September 2003 and April 2006, he advised as leading official on European affairs in the Federal Foreign Office and joined the German Chancellery, advising on the same topic, in May of the same year.

From February 2011 until mid-2015, Mayer-Landrut served as chief adviser to Merkel on European affairs, thereby succeeding Uwe Corsepius.

In July 2015, Meyer-Landrut succeeded Susanne Wasum-Rainer as German Ambassador to France. In 2018, Foreign Minister Heiko Maas vetoed Merkel's plan to appoint Meyer-Landrut as Germany's Permanent Representative to the European Union in Brussels.

Other activities
 Jacques Delors Institute Berlin, Member of the Advisory Board
 Broader European Leadership Agenda (BELA), Member of the Circle of Active Supporters

Personal life
Meyer-Landrut is married to a Frenchwoman and father of four children. He is the nephew of Andreas Meyer-Landrut, head of the Bundespräsidialamt under former German president Richard von Weizsäcker (1984–94), and first cousin once removed of singer Lena Meyer-Landrut.

References 

Ambassadors of Germany to France
People of Baltic German descent
Living people
1966 births
German people of Estonian descent